Republic of Hindutva is a 2021 political commentary book by Indian social historian, Badri Narayan. The book is a field study of how the RSS keeps reinventing itself to spread its worldview.

References

2021 non-fiction books
Indian non-fiction books
21st-century Indian literature
Penguin Books India books